Cassan may refer to:
Cassan Abbey, Aveyron, France
Fiachrae Cássan, a legendary king of Ireland
Gabriel Cassan (1884–1942), French cyclist
Kashan, Iran